Rajko Žižić (January 22, 1955 – August 7, 2003) was a Yugoslavian professional basketball player. The 6'11", 243-pounder represented Yugoslavia at the 1976 Summer Olympics, the 1980 Summer Olympics and the 1984 Summer Olympics, winning silver, gold and bronze respectively.  He died on August 7, 2003, from a heart attack.

References

External links 
 Rajko Žižić (Rajko Zizic) biography on the Žižić family website: Family Zizic 
 Biography at okkbeograd.org.rs

1955 births
2003 deaths
Basketball players at the 1976 Summer Olympics
Basketball players at the 1980 Summer Olympics
Basketball players at the 1984 Summer Olympics
FIBA World Championship-winning players
KK Sutjeska players
KK Crvena zvezda players
KK Crvena Zvezda executives
Members of the Assembly of KK Crvena zvezda
Medalists at the 1984 Summer Olympics
Medalists at the 1980 Summer Olympics
Medalists at the 1976 Summer Olympics
Montenegrin expatriate basketball people in Serbia
Olympic basketball players of Yugoslavia
Olympic gold medalists for Yugoslavia
Olympic silver medalists for Yugoslavia
Olympic bronze medalists for Yugoslavia
Olympic medalists in basketball
OKK Beograd coaches
OKK Beograd players
Sportspeople from Nikšić
Serbian expatriate basketball people in Italy
Serbian expatriate basketball people in France
Serbian men's basketball coaches
Serbian men's basketball players
Serbs of Montenegro
Yugoslav men's basketball players
1978 FIBA World Championship players
1982 FIBA World Championship players
Mediterranean Games gold medalists for Yugoslavia
Mediterranean Games medalists in basketball
Competitors at the 1975 Mediterranean Games
Competitors at the 1979 Mediterranean Games
Centers (basketball)